Ginshachia is a genus of moths belonging to the family Notodontidae.

The species of this genus are found in Southeastern Asia.

Species:
 Ginshachia aritai Nakamura, 1976
 Ginshachia baenzigeri Schintlmeister, 2007
Ginshachia bronacha (Schaus, 1928)
Ginshachia gemmifera (Moore, 1879)

References

Notodontidae
Noctuoidea genera